Ashwin Kumar Lakshmikanthan ( born on 7th May 1991) is an Indian actor who works in Tamil and Telugu films and television productions. He played the lead roles in Star Vijay serials Rettai Vaal Kuruvi (2015) and Ninaikka Therintha Manamae (2017), and had supportive roles in films such as O Kadhal Kanmani (2015) and Adithya Varma (2019). He rose to prominence after contesting in the 2021 reality programme Cooku with Comali 2. The Times of India named him the "Most Desirable Man on Television 2020", in its Chennai Times edition.

He played the lead in Enna Solla Pogirai (2022), Meet Cute (2022) and Sembi (2022).

Early life and education 
Born and brought up in Coimbatore, Ashwin Kumar completed his schooling in Carmel Garden. He pursued his bachelor's degree in Mechanical Engineering from Kumaraguru College of Technology and completed Master of Business Administration from PSG Institute of Management. During his college days, he developed a passion for acting and attended auditions for films and TV series.

Career

Television 
Ashwin Kumar made his television debut on Star Vijay's serial, Office. He played the lead roles in the serials Rettai Vaal Kuruvi (2015) and Ninaikka Therintha Manamae (2017). He also played the lead in Raja Rani, a remake of the hit Tamil serial Saravanan Meenatchi on Star Maa.

Following the end of the series, he appeared in the short films Blink, Cinderella, 3 Scenes of his love story, and Kadhal Ondru Kanden.

He was one of the contestants in the cooking reality show Cooku with Comali – Season 2 on Star Vijay. He was the second runner-up in the finale, and received the "Most Popular Male on Reality Television" award at the Behindwoods Gold Icons 2021 for his performance in Cooku with Comali.

Cinema 
At the start of his film career, Ashwin Kumar played a minor role in Mani Ratnam's O Kadhal Kanmani as a colleague of Dulquer Salmaan's character. He had portrayed the role of Dhruv Vikram’s brother in the film Adithya Varma.

In April 2021 Indiaglitz reported that he would be playing the lead in the romantic comedy movie Enna Solla Pogirai directed by debutante Hariharan for Trident Arts productions. The film was released on the week of Pongal 2022 and a critic with the Times of India wrote "Ashwin makes a confident leap to leading man".

He made his Telugu debut with Meet Cute, an anthology film directed by debutante Deepthi Ghanta and produced by Nani under his banner Wall Poster Cinema. This Telugu anthology consists of five conversational shorts on modern-day relationships. He played the lead role in the segment, Meet the boy and in the review, ottplay.com wrote "Ashwin, exuding charm, is the surprise package". He had next played the lead in Prabhu Solomon’s film, titled Sembi, alongside actors Kovai Sarala and Thambi Ramaiah. Touted to be an intense social drama, set against the backdrop of Kodaikanal, the film was produced by Trident Arts. The film received highly positive reviews from critics and audiences upon release and Ashwin’s performance as a lawyer, a nameless saviour was widely appreciated. A critic from Sakshi Post wrote "Ashwin Kumar as a lawyer keeps the audience on the egde of their seats in the second half with his brilliant show. He has made full use of the opportunity to prove his acting prowess". He has been roped in to play the lead in a romantic thriller film, to be directed by Dejavu fame Arvindh Srinivasan for Zhen Studios.

Web series 
Ashwin Kumar had a lead role in Thanthu Vitten Ennai, a web series produced by Zee5. He was also part of the multilingual, horror-thriller web series Live Telecast directed by Venkat Prabhu for Disney+ Hotstar.

Music videos and model work 
Ashwin Kumar is the lead actor in the music videos "Cloning Kadhal", "Rhythm of Life" (Sony Music), "Shades of Kadhal", "Kutty Pattas" (Sony Music), "Criminal Crush",  "Loner", "Adipoli" (Think Music),  "Baby Nee Sugar", "Yaathi Yaathi" (Sony Music) and "Vaadi Vaadi" (Think Music).

He had given voice-over in the music audio 11:11 – Guru undu Bhayamillai, composed by Ady Kriz.

As a model, he has worked in multiple TV commercials and print adverts for various brands. He is the brand ambassador of Tamil pay television channel, Zee Thirai.

Filmography

Films

Television

Web series

Short films

Music videos

Discography

As voice-over artist

Accolades

Awards and nominations

Other recognitions

References

External links 
 

Living people
Tamil male television actors
Tamil male actors
Male actors in Tamil cinema
People from Tamil Nadu
1991 births
Indian film actors
People from Coimbatore